Theodore Ahamefule Orji CON is a Nigerian politician who was governor of Abia State in southeast Nigeria from 2007 to 2015. He was formerly a career civil servant, and served as the Chief of Staff to Abia Governor Orji Uzor Kalu.

Background

Before becoming governor, he was formerly a career civil servant who served as the Principal Secretary, Abia State Government House. He was later appointed Chief of Staff to the then Abia State Governor, Chief Orji Uzor Kalu.

He is a serving Senator of the Federal Republic of Nigeria, where he has served as Chairman, Senate Committee on Privatization and Vice Chairman, Senate Committee on Agriculture.

Career

Public service 
After completing the National Youth Service Corps Scheme, he began working as an Administrative Officer in the old Imo State civil service in 1979. When Abia State was created in 1991, Orji returned to Umuahia, where he served in several administrative positions, including the Government House, Umuahia, Bureau of Budget and Planning and Ministry of Agriculture.

In March 1996, he was seconded to the National Electoral Commission of Nigeria (NECON), now INEC, Abia State, as Administrative Secretary. He was later redeployed to Enugu State in 1997 to supervise the elections that ushered in the current democratic dispensation in Nigeria. After the polls, Orji returned to Abia State, where he subsequently served in various capacities in the Cabinet Office, Ministry of Lands and Survey, Ministry of Agriculture, and Abia State Government House.

Political career 
In December 2006, Senator Orji won the gubernatorial primaries of the Progressive Peoples Alliance (PPA) to contest the 2007 governorship elections in Abia State. On April 14, 2007, he was elected Governor of Abia State, as declared by the Independent National Electoral Commission, INEC. He was sworn in on Tuesday, May 29, 2007, as the 3rd Executive Governor of Abia State.
In 2011, he re-contested and won a second term.

In 2021, Senator Orji announced his retirement from active politics after completing his second tenure as Senator, representing Abia Central Senatorial District.

Personal life
Chief T.A. Orji has been recognised and conferred many traditional titles, including Ochendo Ibeku, Utuagbaigwe of Ngwaland, and Ohazurume of Abia South. He is married to Mercy Odochi Orji, and they have five children.

Corruption allegations and EFCC investigation
In February 2020, the Economic and Financial Crimes Commission announced an investigation into Orji and his sons, Chinedu and Ogbonna based on a petition the commission received in 2017. The petition, filed by the Fight Corruption: Save Nigeria Group, outlined over ₦500 billion in public funds that were allegedly stolen by Orji and his family. The money was supposedly ₦383 billion from federal accounts, ₦55 billion in excess crude revenue, ₦2.3 billion from SURE-P funds, ₦1.8 billion from ecological funds, a ₦10.5 billion First Bank loan, a ₦4 billion Diamond Bank loan, a ₦12 billion Paris Club refund, a ₦2 billion agricultural loan for farmers, and ₦55 billion in Abia State Oil Producing Areas Development Commission funds along with other government money including a ₦500 million monthly security fund. Later in February 2020, Orji was questioned by the EFCC in relation to the investigation; his son and Abia State House of Assembly Speaker Chinedu Orji was also interrogated as the investigation found that Chinedu had around 100 bank accounts that could have been used to hide the stolen money.

On August 19, 2021, Orji was arrested at the Nnamdi Azikiwe International Airport after he failed to abide by his release conditions. As a part of his release from EFCC custody in 2020, Orji had to forfeit his passport; however, the commission later returned his passport so Orji could travel to Dubai for medical attention and Orji had refused to give the passport back. Later that day, Chinedu turned himself in and was taken into custody. Both were interrogated before being released on bail and told to return for future questioning.

As of August 2022, Orji remained under investigation by the EFCC.

See also
List of Governors of Abia State

References 

Living people
1950 births
Governors of Abia State
Igbo politicians
Peoples Democratic Party state governors of Nigeria
Members of the Senate (Nigeria)
University of Ibadan alumni